Hose House No. 10, also known as Old Hose House No. 10, is a historic fire station located at Evansville, Indiana. The Italianate style brick structure was built in December 1888 to serve the then-northeast side. A tower attached to the building was removed in 1947. In 1977 the fire department moved to a new station on the opposite side of Columbia Street.

It was added to the National Register of Historic Places in 1982.

References 

Fire stations on the National Register of Historic Places in Indiana
Italianate architecture in Indiana
Government buildings completed in 1888
Buildings and structures in Evansville, Indiana
National Register of Historic Places in Evansville, Indiana